Cully Richards (1908–1978) was an American singer, and film and television actor. He had a recurring role as First Sergeant Stanley Wozniak on the 1962–1963 situation comedy Don't Call Me Charlie!.

Selected filmography
 Sing, Baby, Sing (1936)
 Pick a Star (1937)
 Something to Sing About (1937)
 Here's Flash Casey (1938)
 Swing It, Sailor! (1938)
 Let's Face It (1943)
 Race Street (1948)

References

Bibliography
 Everett Aaker. George Raft: The Films. McFarland, 2013.

External links

1908 births
1978 deaths
American male television actors
American male film actors
Male actors from Cleveland
20th-century American male actors